Darband is a village in Darjazin Rural District, in the Central District of Mehdishahr County, Semnan Province, Iran. At the 2006 census, its population was 20, in 4 families.

References 

Populated places in Mehdishahr County